Raja Bora (Assamese: ৰাজা বৰা), alias Polash Phukan, was the personal bodyguard of Arabinda Rajkhowa, the chairman of United Liberation Front of Assam, a revolutionary rebel organisation operating in the Indian state of Assam.

Arrest
On December 4, 2009, Bora, with the group's chairman Arabinda Rajkhowa and eight others, surrendered before the Indian authority near the Indo-Bangladesh border in Meghalaya. They were said to be taken into custody by the Border Security Force the moment they had crossed the border near Dawki in Meghalaya's East Khasi Hills.

Charges
Apart from the charge of waging war against India, there is a pending murder case registered against him with Joipur police station. He was sought in the murder of Cheniram Borah, a resident of Barhoni gaon near Nahorkatiya in 2005.

See also
List of top leaders of ULFA
Sanjukta Mukti Fouj
Enigma Group
28th Battalion (ULFA)

References

Living people
Prisoners and detainees from Assam
ULFA members
Year of birth missing (living people)